The $20 Challenge was an Australian reality television series that was broadcast on the Network Ten in 2000. The show was hosted by Tim Bailey, and saw four Australians trying to survive in a foreign country with nothing but $20 to their name.

The eventual winner was Rhiannon Kelly-Pearce. The show was the first television role for James Mathison.

See also 
 List of Australian television series
 List of Network Ten programs

References

2000s Australian reality television series
Network 10 original programming
2001 Australian television series debuts
2001 Australian television series endings